Ålen Station is a railway station located in the village of Renbygda in the municipality of Holtålen in Trøndelag county, Norway.  It is located on the Røros Line. The station is served three times daily in each direction by Trøndelag Commuter Rail between the town of Røros and the city of Trondheim. The service is operated by SJ Norge.  The station was opened in 1901.

References

Holtålen
Railway stations in Trøndelag
Railway stations on the Røros Line
Railway stations opened in 1901
1901 establishments in Norway